The Cambrian Caving Council (CCC) (formed 1969) is the national governing body of caving in Wales. It is the national association for caving, representing the interests of caving clubs in Wales, Forest of Dean and the Marches. CCC is a member of, or else is represented at, several organisations including the Natural Resources Wales National Access Forum, and the Welsh Sports Association. The CCC also maintains contact with several other regional and national bodies including various bat groups, Sport Wales, Brecon Beacons National Park Authority, and the other Regional Bodies of the British Caving Association.

See also 

 Caving in the United Kingdom

References

Sports governing bodies in Wales
Caving organisations in the United Kingdom
1969 establishments in Wales